Brian A. Forster (born April 14, 1960) is an American former child actor and race car driver. He is best known as the second actor to play the role of Chris Partridge in the television series The Partridge Family.

Biography
Forster joined The Partridge Family in 1971, replacing Jeremy Gelbwaks, and continued until the show ended in 1974. Chris Partridge was the drummer of the fictional family band. As of 2002/2003, Forster was a racing car driver in Northern California, and continued to act in community theater there.

Forster was born in Los Angeles, the son of English-born actors Jennifer Raine and Peter Forster and, through his mother, a great-great-great-grandson of Charles Dickens.  He is also the stepson of actor Whit Bissell and stepgrandson of actor Alan Napier, who portrayed Alfred the Butler in the Batman television series (1966–1968).

Filmography

References

External links

Archive.org: The Talking Car (1969) – Forster stars in and narrates this traffic safety film

1960 births
Living people
American male child actors
American male voice actors
20th-century American male actors
American male television actors
Male actors from Los Angeles
Charles Dickens